Miklós Németh (born 1948) is a Hungarian economist and politician who served as Prime Minister of Hungary from 1988 to 1990.

Miklós Németh may also refer to:

 Miklós Németh (cyclist) (1910–?), Hungarian cyclist who competed at the 1936 Summer Olympics
 Miklós Németh (footballer) (born 1946), Hungarian association football player
 Miklós Németh (javelin thrower) (born 1946), Hungarian athlete competed at the 1968/72/76/80 Summer Olympics